José "Peluche" Peña Gutiérrez (born December 3, 1942) is a Mexican former pitcher in Major League Baseball. He pitched from 1969 to 1972 for the Cincinnati Reds and Los Angeles Dodgers.

External links

1942 births
Living people
Baseball players from Chihuahua
Bravos de León players
Broncos de Reynosa players
Buffalo Bisons (minor league) players
Cafeteros de Córdoba players
Cardenales de Villahermosa players
Cincinnati Reds players
El Paso Sun Kings players
Indianapolis Indians players
Indios de Ciudad Juárez (minor league) players
Leones de Yucatán players
Los Angeles Dodgers players
Major League Baseball pitchers
Major League Baseball players from Mexico
Mayos de Navojoa players
Mexican Baseball Hall of Fame inductees
Mexican expatriate baseball players in the United States
Mexican League baseball pitchers
Mineros de Coahuila players
Pericos de Puebla players
Spokane Indians players
Sportspeople from Ciudad Juárez
Tigres de Aguascalientes players
Tigres del México players